Gavi Cheshmeh (also Romanized as Gavī Cheshmeh; also known as Gavcheshmeh) is a village in Hakimabad Rural District, in the Central District of Zarandieh County, Markazi Province, Iran. At the 2006 census, its population was 39, in 8 families.

References 

Populated places in Zarandieh County